The PBS TJ80-120 is a small subsonic turbojet engine produced by a Czech turbine engine manufacturer PBS Velká Bíteš.

Development
The engine has been developed for unmanned aerial vehicles, including target drones, remote carriers, unmanned combat systems and disposable applications with weight ranging from 330-551 lb (150-250 kg). The PBS TJ80-120 has the best thrust-to-weight ratio among gas turbine engines with thrust more than 1,150 N. With a thrust 269 lbf (1,200 N) and weight 28.21 lb (12.8 kg) including the accessories, the thrust-to-weight ratio is currently 9.53.

Design 
The PBS TJ80-120 is a small single-shaft turbojet engine with a built-in brushless starter generator including the ECU. The engine is capable of ground and in-flight restart under 7 seconds and a windmill starting. The engine offers a possibility of salt water recovery.

Specifications

References 

Aircraft engines
Turbojet engines